The chestnut-winged babbler (Cyanoderma erythropterum) is a babbler species in the family Timaliidae. It occurs in the Malay Peninsula from southern Thailand to Singapore, and in Sumatra. It is listed as Least Concern on the IUCN Red List.

It feeds on small Coleoptera beetles, Phasmida insects, ants, and Hemiptera bugs.

Timalia erythroptera was the scientific name proposed by Edward Blyth in 1842 for an olive-brown babbler from Nepal.
It was later placed in the genus Stachyris, but since 2020 is recognised as a Cyanoderma species. The grey-hooded babbler (C. bicolor) of Borneo was formerly considered conspecific.

References

External links 

chestnut-winged babbler
Birds of the Malay Peninsula
Birds of Sumatra
chestnut-winged babbler
chestnut-winged babbler
Taxonomy articles created by Polbot